Mount Zion Church may refer to the following churches:

United States
(by state, then city/town)
 Mt. Zion Christian Church, Richmond, Kentucky
Mount Zion Church and Cemetery (Hallsville, Missouri), listed on the National Register of Historic Places (NRHP) in Boone County
Mount Zion Brick Church, Barada, Nebraska, listed on the NRHP in Richardson County
Mount Zion Church (Big Sandy, Tennessee), once listed on the NRHP in Benton County
Mount Zion Church (Decatur, Tennessee), listed on the NRHP in Meigs County
Mt. Zion Church and Cemetery (Elkhorn, Tennessee), listed on the NRHP in Henry County

United Kingdom
 West Church, Pitlochry Church of Scotland, in Perthshire, known as Mount Zion

See also
Battle of Mount Zion Church
Mount Zion (disambiguation)
 Zion Church (disambiguation)
Mount Zion A.M.E. Church (disambiguation)
Mount Zion Baptist Church (disambiguation)
Mount Zion Methodist Episcopal Church (disambiguation)
Mount Zion Presbyterian Church (disambiguation)
Mount Zion United Methodist Church (disambiguation)